St. Stephens Indian School is a tribal K-12 school in St. Stephens, a settlement in Arapahoe, Wyoming. The school is affiliated with the Bureau of Indian Education (BIE).

A priest in a Jesuit order of the Catholic church established the school in 1884.

In 1985 there was a proposal to merge the school, then the St. Stephens Indian High School, with the Arapahoe School.

In 2015 the school created a documentary, "Listening For A New Day: the making of an Arapaho buffalo hide tipi," about its students creating tipis the traditional way. The documentary won the Red Nation Film Festival Oyate award.

References

External links
 St. Stephens Indian School

Native American K-12 schools
Public elementary schools in Wyoming
Public middle schools in Wyoming
Public high schools in Wyoming
Public K-12 schools in the United States
1884 establishments in Wyoming Territory
Educational institutions established in 1884
Native American history of Wyoming
Arapaho